is one of the Fuji Five Lakes and located in the town of Fujikawaguchiko in southern Yamanashi Prefecture near Mount Fuji, Japan.

The remnants of the lava flow are now under the Aokigahara Jukai Forest, and there is evidence to indicate that these three lakes remain connected by underground waterways.

The lake is within the borders of the Fuji-Hakone-Izu National Park.

As with the other Fuji Five Lakes, the area is a popular resort, with many lakeside hotels, windsurfing facilities, camp sites, and excursion boats. Japanese white crucian carp and wakasagi were introduced to the lake in the Meiji period, and sports fishing is also popular. The water of the lake lacks transparency and has a tendency towards a greenish hue due to algae.

Lake Shōji is given the name "Switzerland of East Asia" because Englishmen in the Meiji Era explored around the base of Mount Fuji, and remarked that the view of the mountain was most beautiful from Lake Shoji. The placid lake is rich in nutrients which include plankton. Here, rental boats are available along the shore to rent.

See also
 Fuji Five Lakes
 Fuji-Hakone-Izu National Park

Notes

References 

Rafferty, John P. Plate Tectonics, Volcanoes, and Earthquakes. Rosen Publishing (2010), 

Shoji
Tourist attractions in Yamanashi Prefecture
Landforms of Yamanashi Prefecture
Mount Fuji
Fujikawaguchiko, Yamanashi